John McGill Oswald (1869–1953) was a Scottish professional footballer who played as an inside right. He won the Scottish Cup with Third Lanark alongside his elder brother Jimmy Oswald in 1889, scoring in the victory over Celtic in the final. Both siblings (who were born in Greenock but relocated to the Gorbals area of Glasgow with their family when very young), then moved to England to play for Notts County.

References
 

1869 births
1953 deaths
Footballers from Greenock
People from Gorbals
Footballers from Glasgow
Scottish footballers
Association football inside forwards
Third Lanark A.C. players
Notts County F.C. players
Greenock Morton F.C. players
Sunderland Albion F.C. players
Burnley F.C. players
English Football League players
Scottish Football League players